Agasicles, alternatively spelled Agesicles or Hegesicles, was a king of Sparta, the 13th of the line of Procles. 

Son of Archidamus I, he was contemporary with the Agiad Leon, and succeeded his father,  probably about 590 BC or 600. During his reign the Lacedaemonians carried on an unsuccessful war against Tegea, but prospered in their other wars. (Herod. i. 65; Paus. iii. 7, § 6, 3. §. 5.) He was succeeded by his son Ariston.

Notes

References
 

6th-century BC rulers
6th-century BC Spartans
Eurypontid kings of Sparta
6th-century BC deaths]
Year of birth unknown